Timofei Vyacheslavovich Margasov (born 12 June 1992) is a Russian professional footballer who plays as a right midfielder for PFC Sochi. He played for most of his career as a right-back.

Club career
He made his debut in the Russian Second Division for FC Akademiya Tolyatti on 24 April 2011 in a game against FC Oktan Perm.

He played as FC Tosno won the 2017–18 Russian Cup final against FC Avangard Kursk on 9 May 2018 in the Volgograd Arena.

On 22 February 2019, he joined Sochi on loan until the end of the 2018–19 season.

On 4 August 2020 he moved to Sochi on a permanent basis.

Honours

Club
Rostov
Russian Cup: 2013–14

Tosno
 Russian Cup: 2017–18

Career statistics

Notes

References

External links
 

1992 births
Sportspeople from Tolyatti
Living people
Russia under-21 international footballers
Russian footballers
Association football midfielders
Association football defenders
FC Yenisey Krasnoyarsk players
FC Rostov players
FC Sibir Novosibirsk players
PFC Krylia Sovetov Samara players
FC Lokomotiv Moscow players
FC Tosno players
PFC Sochi players
Russian Premier League players
Russian First League players
Russian Second League players